The 2021 Grand Prix of Portland was an IndyCar motor race held on September 12, 2021 at the Portland International Raceway. It was the 14th round of the 2021 IndyCar Series season. 

The race was won by Álex Palou, who started on pole, with Alexander Rossi finishing second and Scott Dixon third.

Background 
The event was held over the weekend of September 11-12, 2021 at the Portland International Raceway in Portland, Oregon. It marked the return of the circuit to the calendar, as the race was canceled in the year prior due to the COVID-19 pandemic.

The race was the 14th race of the 16-race season. It was held three weeks after the Bommarito Automotive Group 500 at the World Wide Technology Raceway in Madison, Illinois, which was the last oval race of the season, and was the first of three races in the triple-header finale, which continued in the Firestone Grand Prix of Monterey at Laguna Seca (September 19) and culminates in the Acura Grand Prix of Long Beach at the Long Beach street circuit (September 26).

Will Power was the previous race winner, having won the 2019 event.

Championship standings before the race 
Pato O'Ward returned to the top of the driver standings with a ten-point lead, after he finished second in the Bommarito Automotive Group 500, where championship rival Álex Palou crashed out, losing out again on a large points haul following the premature end of his race in the Big Machine Spiked Coolers Grand Prix. Josef Newgarden climbed up to third following his race win at Gateway, demoting Scott Dixon to fourth, above his teammate Marcus Ericsson, who sat fifth.

Honda retained their lead of the manufacturer standings over Chevrolet.

Entrants 
27 drivers entered the race, including IndyCar Series debutant Callum Ilott, driving for Juncos Hollinger Racing, who return to the series after being absent in the 2020 season.

The race also marked Oliver Askew's first race for Rahal Letterman Lanigan Racing.

Practice 
Practice 1 took place at 12:00 PM ET on September 11. Only one pre-qualifying practice session was held. Álex Palou set the fastest time, after spinning out of track halfway through the session, though no damage was suffered. Meyer Shank Racing drivers Hélio Castroneves and Jack Harvey set the second and third fastest time respectively.

Qualifying 
Qualifying took place at 3:15 PM ET on September 11. Álex Palou won pole position with a time of 00:58.7701, ahead of Alexander Rossi in second and Scott Dixon in third.

Qualifying classification 

 Notes
 Bold text indicates fastest time set in session.
  - Romain Grosjean initially finished seventh in Group 1, but had two of his fastest times deleted due to a penalty for interference, dropping him down to eleventh.
  - Rinus VeeKay was given a six-place grid penalty due to an unscheduled engine change, following his crash at the Bommarito Automotive Group 500.
  - Takuma Sato was given a grid penalty due to an unscheduled engine change, following engine problems at Practice 1.
  - Ryan Hunter-Reay was handed a grid penalty due to an unscheduled engine change, after experiencing engine issues that led him to be unable to set a time in qualifying.

Final Practice 
Final Practice took place at 6:15 PM ET on September 11. This session was held after the qualifying sessions. The session ended with no major incidents. Scott Dixon set the fastest time, with Josef Newgarden in second and Ed Jones in third.

Race 
The race started on 3:00 PM ET on September 12. The start of the race was marked with a chaotic dash into Turn 1, which caused several drivers to make contact. As a result, James Hinchcliffe had to retire from the race, and the first caution of the day was brought out, with Pato O'Ward taking the lead in lap 1. The race resumed in lap 10 and O'Ward led for 29 laps, until he entered the pits. Graham Rahal inherited the lead from O'Ward. The race lead was subsequently held by numerous drivers as the race continued, until it fell again to Rahal on lap 44. 

On lap 52, as Rahal led the race, Dalton Kellett and IndyCar debutant Callum Ilott each went off-track, in Turn 1 and Turn 7 respectively, due to mechanical issues, which brought out the second caution of the race. The race resumed after 5 laps of caution. The race lead continued to cycle through several drivers, as Will Power and Simon Pagenaud made contact in Turn 7, which brought out the race's third caution in lap 86. In this lap, Álex Palou took the lead of the race, where he would stay until the end of the race. Another caution was brought out in lap 90 for two laps as Sébastien Bourdais and Oliver Askew made contact in Turn 2, which resulted in the latter retiring from the race. 

Palou finished first, clinching his third win of the season and therefore retaking the championship lead from O'Ward, who finished 14th. Alexander Rossi and Scott Dixon finished second and third respectively, rounding up an all-Honda podium.

Race classification 

Cautions: 4 for 20 laps

Lead Changes: 12

Championship standings after the race 

Drivers' Championship standings

Engine manufacturer standings

Note: Only the top five positions are included.

References

External links 

Grand Prix of Portland
Grand Prix of Portland
Grand Prix of Portland